was a Japanese professional baseball outfielder. He played three seasons in Nippon Professional Baseball for Hankyu (Braves) and the Asahi Baseball Club. He died at the age of 90 in 2016.

References

External links

1925 births
2016 deaths
Nippon Professional Baseball outfielders
Baseball people from Osaka Prefecture
Japanese baseball players